Megaleuctra is a genus of rolled-winged stoneflies in the family Leuctridae. There are about seven described species in Megaleuctra.

Species
These seven species belong to the genus Megaleuctra:
 Megaleuctra complicata Claassen, 1937 (Pacific needlefly)
 Megaleuctra flinti Baumann, 1973
 Megaleuctra kincaidi Frison, 1942
 Megaleuctra saebat Ham & Bae, 2002
 Megaleuctra stigmata (Banks, 1900)
 Megaleuctra williamsae Hanson, 1941
 † Megaleuctra neavei Ricker, 1936

References

Further reading

 
 

Plecoptera
Articles created by Qbugbot